The Haunting of Helen Walker is a 1995 TV film based on 1898 novella The Turn of the Screw by Henry James.

Cast
Valerie Bertinelli as Helen Walker
Diana Rigg as Mrs Grose
Florence Hoath as Flora Goffe
Aled Roberts as Miles Goffe
Michael Gough as Barnaby
Paul Rhys as Edward Goffe
Christopher Guard as Peter Quint
Elizabeth Morton as Miss Jessel
Tricia Thorns as Peggy
Aisling Flitton as Connie
Flip Webster as Alice
Mark Longhurst as Luke

Reception
The film was seen by 13.6 million when it premiered.

References

External links
The Haunting of Helen Walker at IMDb
The Haunting of Helen Walker at TCMDB

1995 television films
1995 films
Films based on The Turn of the Screw
American television films